Milton Kaiman (March 5, 1921 – February 24, 1977), better known as Milt Kamen, was an American stand-up comic and actor with numerous television credits. As a stand-up comic, Kamen was a favorite of Mel Brooks, Groucho Marx and Woody Allen. According to writer Kliph Nesteroff, Kamen worked as a stand-in for Sid Caesar on Caesar's Hour, inventing bits of business that Caesar claimed for his own.

Life and career
Born in Hurleyville, New York, his family moved to the Brownsville neighborhood in Brooklyn, New York when he was two years old. Kamen began his comedy career as a regular on Caesar's Hour in 1954. He frequently performed his comedy routines on shows hosted by Ed Sullivan, Steve Allen, Perry Como, Merv Griffin, Mike Douglas, and Johnny Carson and made guest appearances on What's My Line?, The Match Game, Tattletales, Pantomime Quiz, The Gong Show, Personality, Password, Missing Links, You're Putting Me On, To Tell the Truth, The $10,000 Pyramid and The Hollywood Palace. While performing at a resort in the Catskills, Kamen discovered Woody Allen.

As an actor, Kamen appeared in Route 66, Naked City, Ben Casey, McMillan & Wife, Love, American Style, The Partridge Family, Mannix, The Streets of San Francisco, and Quincy M.E., among others. His feature film credits include Me, Natalie, The Out-of-Towners, Mother, Jugs & Speed and W.C. Fields and Me.

Kamen's  Broadway theatre credits were as a garrulous waiter in an Off Broadway production of William Saroyan's “Across the Board on Tomorrow Morning;” “A Thurber Carnival,” Murray Schisgal's “The Typist and The Tiger,”  and in “The Passion of Josef D.”  the 1964 Paddy Chayefsky play, in which he played opposite Luther Adler and Peter Falk. It closed after one preview and 16 performances.

Before beginning his comedy career, Kamen was a Juilliard-trained French Horn player,  occupying chair in the Metropolitan Opera Orchestra.

Kamen died of a heart attack at the age of 55 in Beverly Hills.

Filmography

References

External links
 Milt Kamen on The Jack Paar Program
 Audio of Milt Kamen's Stand-up Comedy Act
 Milt Kamen on Celebrity Bowling

1921 births
1977 deaths
American stand-up comedians
American male television actors
American male film actors
Jewish American comedians
Jewish American male actors
20th-century American male actors
20th-century American comedians
20th-century American Jews